Lusotropicalism is a term and "quasi-theory" developed by Brazilian sociologist Gilberto Freyre to describe the distinctive character of Portuguese imperialism overseas, proposing that the Portuguese were better colonizers than other European nations.

Freyre theorized that because of Portugal's warmer climate, and having been inhabited by Celts, Romans, Visigoths, Moors and several other peoples in pre-modern times, the Portuguese were more humane, friendly, and adaptable to other climates and cultures. He saw "Portuguese-based cultures as cultures of ecumenical expansion" and suggested that "Lusotropical culture was a form of resistance against both the 'barbaric' Soviet communist influence, and the also 'barbarian' process of Americanization and capitalist expansion."

In addition, by the early 20th century, Portugal was by far the European colonial power with the oldest territorial presence overseas; in some cases its territories had been continuously settled and ruled by the Portuguese for five centuries. Lusotropicalism celebrated both actual and mythological elements of racial democracy and civilizing mission in the Portuguese Empire, encompassing a pro-miscegenation attitude toward the colonies or overseas territories. The ideology is best exemplified in the work of Freyre.

Background

The beginning of the Portuguese Empire is usually traced to the 1415 Conquest of Ceuta in North Africa. In the succeeding decades of the 15th century, Portuguese sailors traveled all over the world: Bartolomeu Dias rounded the Cape of Good Hope in 1488; Vasco da Gama reached India in 1498; and Pedro Álvares Cabral made landfall in Brazil in 1500. At first the Portuguese were interested primarily in lucrative trade opportunities (including the slave trade), and by the end of the 16th century the Portuguese had established trading outposts in Africa, India, Brazil, the Middle East, and South Asia. During this time there was some minimal Portuguese intermarrying with and settlement among African and Asian peoples. It was much more common for the Portuguese to bring Asian and especially African peoples to Europe and Brazil, most often though not always as enslaved people. As early as the 1570s, Lisbon had a sizeable and well-known Black African population of enslaved and free people.

During the New Imperialist Scramble for Africa of the 1890s onward, Portugal expanded its coastal African territories in modern Angola, Mozambique, and Guinea-Bissau inland. Like other European colonial empires, Portugal achieved this expansion primarily through physical and economic violence against native peoples. After the 1910 Portuguese Revolution, and as an official policy of the 1933–1974 Estado Novo dictatorship, Black people in Portuguese Africa were de jure eligible for full Portuguese citizenship and its attendant rights. In practice, Black people hardly ever achieved such status, and during the Estado Novo even white Portuguese born in Africa were denied the same legal rights and protections as whites born in metropolitan Portugal.

Application during the Estado Novo

Prior to Freyre's publication of Casa-Grande & Senzala, few—if any—Portuguese politicians and colonial administrators conceived of the Portuguese Empire as a multicultural, multiracial, and pluricontinental nation. They were more likely to think of Portuguese colonialism as a logical historical extension or continuation of the Reconquista. For example, Armindo Monteiro, Portuguese Minister of Colonies between 1931 and 1935, considered himself a "Social Darwinist" and was a proponent of the traditional colonial "civilizing mission" and white saviorism. Monteiro believed Portugal had a "historic obligation" to civilize the "inferior races" who lived in its African and Asian territories by converting them to Christianity and teaching them a work ethic.

Portuguese dictator António de Oliveira Salazar strongly resisted Freyre's ideas throughout the 1930s and 1940s, partly because Freyre claimed the Portuguese were more prone to miscegenation than other European nations. He adopted Lusotropicalism only after sponsoring Freyre on a visit to Portugal and some of its overseas territories in 1951 and 1952. Freyre's work Aventura e Rotina (Adventure and Routine) was a result of this trip.

Salazar adopted Lusotropicalism by asserting that since Portugal had been a multicultural, multiracial, and pluricontinental nation since the 15th century, losing its overseas territories in Africa and Asia would dismember the country and end Portuguese independence. According to Salazar, in geopolitical terms, losing these territories would decrease the Portuguese state's self-sufficiency.

Critique

Freyre's response to criticism
The life of Freyre, after he published Casa-Grande & Senzala, became an eternal source of explanation. He repeated several times that he did not create the myth of a racial democracy and that the fact that his books recognized the intense mixing between "races" in Brazil did not mean a lack of prejudice or discrimination. He pointed out that many people have claimed the United States to have been an "exemplary democracy" whereas slavery and racial segregation were present throughout most of US history:

"The interpretation of those who want to place me among the sociologists or anthropologists who said prejudice of race among the Portuguese or the Brazilians never existed is extreme. What I have always suggested is that such prejudice is minimal... when compared to that which is still in place elsewhere, where laws still regulate relations between Europeans and other groups".

"It is not that racial prejudice or social prejudice related to complexion are absent in Brazil. They exist. But no one here would have thought of "white-only" Churches. No one in Brazil would have thought of laws against interracial marriage ... Fraternal spirit is stronger among Brazilians than racial prejudice, colour, class or religion. It is true that equality has not been reached since the end of slavery.... There was racial prejudice among plantation owners, there was social distance between the masters and the slaves, between whites and blacks.... But few wealthy Brazilians were as concerned with racial purity as the majority were in the Old South".

See also
Eurasianism
Lusosphere
Overseas province
Pluricontinentalism
Racial democracy
Luso-Africans
Assimilados
Prazeros
Lançados
Mestiços
Órfãs do Rei
Tropicalismo

References

Further reading
 Castelo, Cláudia, O Modo Português de estar no Mundo' O luso-tropicalismo e a ideologia colonial portuguesa (1933–1961). Porto: Edições Afrontamento, 1999.
 Cahen, Michel, "'Portugal is in the Sky': Conceptual Considerations on Communities, Lusitanity and Lusophony", in E.Morier-Genoud & M.Cahen (eds), Imperial Migrations. Colonial Communities and Diaspora in the Portuguese World, London: Palgrave, 2012.
 Nery da Fonseca, Edson. Em Torno de Gilberto Freyre. Recife: Editora Massangana, 2007.
 Nery da Fonseca, Edson. Gilberto Freyre de A a Z – Referências essenciais à sua vida e obra. Rio de Janeiro: Zé mario Editor, 2002.
 Ribeiro, Ana Beatriz. Modernization Dreams, Lusotropical Promises: A Global Studies Perspective on Brazil-Mozambique Development Discourse (Africa-Europe Group for Interdisciplinary Studies, vol. 23). Leiden: Brill, 2020.
 Vakil, Abdoolkarim, "'Mundo Pretuguês': Colonial and Postcolonial Diasporic Dis/articulations", in E.Morier-Genoud & M.Cahen (eds), Imperial Migrations. Colonial Communities and Diaspora in the Portuguese World, London: Palgrave, 2012.
 Villon, Victor. O Mundo Português que Gilberto Freyre Criou – seguido de Diálogos com Edson Nery da Fonseca. Rio de Janeiro, Vermelho Marinho, 2010.

20th century in Portugal
Portuguese Empire
Portuguese culture
Multiracial affairs in Brazil